Baoji, also Boqê and Poche is a township in  Baingoin County, Tibet Autonomous Region, People's Republic of China. 
It lies at an altitude of 4,785 metres (15,702 feet).

See also
List of towns and villages in Tibet Autonomous Region

Populated places in Nagqu
Township-level divisions of Tibet